Sheltered Daughters is a 1921 American silent film directed by Edward Dillon, starring Justine Johnstone, Riley Hatch, Charles K. Gerrard and Warner Baxter.

Plot
Jim Dark (Hatch) is a police officer determined to shelter his daughter, Jenny (Johnstone), from the world and its evils.  As a result, Jenny lives in a dream world, fascinated with Joan of Arc.  She meets a man posing as a Frenchman (Gerrard) who takes advantage of her and her naivete.  He asks Jenny's help in collecting charity ostensibly for French orphans, all the while planning to pocket the money.  Jenny's father, though, learns of the plot and intervenes before the outlaw can get away.

Cast
Justine Johnstone as Jenny Dark
Riley Hatch as Jim Dark, Her Father
Warner Baxter as Pep Mullins
Charles K. Gerrard as French Pete 
Helen Ray as Adele
Edna Holland as Sonia
James Laffey as Cleghorn
Jimmie Lapsley as Pinky Porter
Dan E. Charles as The Ferret

Preservation status 
It is not known whether any prints of the film survive.

References

External links

1921 films
Silent American comedy films
1921 comedy films
Films directed by Edward Dillon
American black-and-white films
American silent feature films
1920s American films
1920s English-language films
English-language comedy films